Majid Al Futtaim (1934 – 17 December 2021) was an Emirati billionaire businessman, and 
the founder and owner of the Majid Al Futtaim Group, an Emirati real estate and retail conglomerate, with projects in Asia and Africa.

Early life
Majid Al Futtaim was the cousin of fellow billionaire Abdulla Al Futtaim, the head of the Al-Futtaim Group, from whom he later became estranged.
 The Al-Futtaim Group currently spans 15 international markets and employs over 33,000 people.

Career
He was the founder and owner of the Majid Al Futtaim Group, which he began in 1992 after splitting the Al Futtaim empire with his cousin.

According to Forbes, Al Futtaim's net worth was US$4 billion, in September 2021.

Notable buildings 
His company's most notable properties include the Mall of the Emirates, complete with an indoor ski slope, and the Mall of Egypt that opened in March 2017.

Personal life and death
Al Futtaim owned the yacht Quattroelle, built by Lürssen in 2013 for Michael Lee-Chin, who sold it in 2014. It has a crew of 29.

He was married and lived in Dubai. Al Futtaim died in Dubai on 17 December 2021. His son Tariq Al Futtaim currently serves on the board of the Majid Al Futtaim Group.

References

1934 births
2021 deaths
Emirati billionaires
Emirati businesspeople